Nelson Torres Yordán (born October 7, 1981) is a Puerto Rican politician affiliated with the Popular Democratic Party (PPD). He was the Speaker in the city legislature of Guayanilla, Puerto Rico, and he was later elected to the Puerto Rico House of Representatives in 2012 to represent District 23. Torres resigned to his seat in January 2016 to be sworn in as Mayor of Guayanilla. Nelson Torres Yordán earned a Juris Doctor from the Pontifical Catholic University of Puerto Rico in Ponce, Puerto Rico.

Torres Yordán was mayor of Guayanilla on January 7, 2020 when a 6.4 magnitude earthquake destroyed the parish church and other structures in Guayanilla Pueblo. A day before a 5.7 magnitude earthquake had destroyed various structures and cars.

References

|-

Living people
1981 births
People from Guayanilla, Puerto Rico
Popular Democratic Party members of the House of Representatives of Puerto Rico
Pontifical Catholic University of Puerto Rico alumni
Politicians from Ponce